Bland skurkar, helgon och vanligt folk (Among villains, saints and ordinary folk) is a live album recorded during a 1999 Swedish summer tour of the same name, and includes tracks by Stefan Sundström, Lars Winnerbäck, Johan Johansson, Karin Renberg, and Kjell Höglund. The album was released by Birdnest Records in 1999.

Track listing
, skurkar och vanligt folk}} (Kjell Höglund)
 (Lars Winnerbäck)
 ( Johan Johansson)
 (Karin Renberg)
 (Karin Renberg)
 (Stefan Sundström)
 (Kjell Höglund)
 (Johan Johansson)
 (Stefan Sundström)
 (Stefan Sundström)
 (Lars Winnerbäck)
 (Johan Johansson)
 (Stefan Sundström)
 (Lars Winnerbäck)
 (Kjell Höglund)
 (Lars Winnerbäck)

References 

Lars Winnerbäck albums
1999 live albums
Live albums by Swedish artists